Admiral Rowland Nugent (22 December 1861 – 25 March 1948) was a Royal Navy officer.

References

1861 births
1948 deaths
Royal Navy admirals
Royal Navy admirals of World War I
Place of birth missing
Place of death missing